Iosif Adamidis was a Greek politician.

Adamidis was born in Korçë. In following July he participated in the Delvino Assembly, as a representative of Korçë, where the delegates of the Autonomous Republic of Northern Epirus ratified the Protocol of Corfu. The latter document granted an autonomous status for Northern Epirus under nominal Albanian sovereignty.

He was elected as member of the Greek parliament (1915-1917) for the Korytsa prefecture, when his birth city came under Greek control.

References

Sources

Greek MPs 1915–1917
Northern Epirus independence activists
People from Korçë
Modern history of Albania